0032 is a custom-built 1932 Ford roadster built by Chip Foose for Chuck Svatos. It won the 2000 America's Most Beautiful Roadster award.

History 
0032 started life as a Hot Rods by Boyd project, Boydster II. After Hot Rods by Boyd went bankrupt, the car was taken in hand by Foose. It was repainted black, over the original yellow, reupholstered, and entered in the 2000 Oakland Roadster Show.  It won that year's America's Most Beautiful Roadster award.

As built, the car rode on a set of Foose's custom-designed five-spoke knockoff wheels, one of only two sets to exist (the other used on his Ridler-winner, The Stallion), as "big'n'little"s:   in front,  in back.

0032 was Foose's first project as an independent operator.

Notes

External links 
Foose bio

Modified vehicles
Automotive styling features
One-off cars

1930s cars
2000s cars
Kustom Kulture
Individual cars